Siegfried Pyre is a -elevation summit located in the eastern Grand Canyon, in Coconino County of northern Arizona, United States. It is situated adjacent to the eastern North Rim, specifically, to the east face of the Walhalla Plateau. It is southeast of Atoko Point and northeast of Naji Point. One of its nearest neighbors is Mount Hayden, as well as Brady Peak.

Because the peak is close to the east face of the Walhalla Plateau, it happens to be at the headwaters of three drainages to the Colorado River, the Kwagunt Creek, north-then-east, the Lava Creek drainage, south-then-east, and the Chuar Creek drainage, southeast-then-east.

See also
 Geology of the Grand Canyon area
 Swilling Butte
 Butchart Butte
 Hubbell Butte

References

External links
 Siegfried Pyre photo by Harvey Butchart

Grand Canyon
Grand Canyon National Park
Colorado Plateau

Landforms of Coconino County, Arizona
Mountains of Arizona
Mountains of Coconino County, Arizona
North American 2000 m summits